Sriyani Wijewickrama is a Sri Lankan politician and a member of the Parliament of Sri Lanka. She is an Attorney-at-Law by profession and an alumnus of University of Colombo In 2017 she left the Mahajana Eksath Peramuna to join Sri Lanka Freedom Party and was appointed as the State Minister of Provincial Councils and Local government by President Maithripala Sirisena

References

Members of the 14th Parliament of Sri Lanka
Members of the 15th Parliament of Sri Lanka
1969 births
Living people
Women legislators in Sri Lanka
21st-century Sri Lankan women politicians